Whatever Happened to ..? is a series of eleven plays broadcast in two series on BBC Radio 4 in 1994 and 1995. They covered the fate of various fictional characters, such as Popeye and Susan Foreman, the granddaughter of the Doctor in Doctor Who. The writer was Adrian Mourby, who in 1997 published a book called Whatever Happened to ...?: The Ultimate Sequels Book, in a similar vein with the further adventures of Frankenstein's Monster, The Artful Dodger, Snow White, Romeo, Big Bad Wolf, Pinocchio, Man Friday, Jane Eyre, Dorothy Gale from The Wonderful Wizard of Oz, and Jim Hawkins.

Episodes

Series one

Series two

Commercial releases
Whatever Happened to Susan Foreman? has been released as an extra on the Doctor Who DVD The Dalek Invasion of Earth.

The Radio 4 series starred Sir Michael Hordern, Jane Asher (as Susan), Lesley Philips (as the Big Bad Wolf), Roshan Seth (as Mowgli) Warren Mitchell and James Grout. The first series won Adrian Mourby the Sony Silver Award for Creative Writing on Radio.

External links
 
Episode listing on epguides.com
Review of the Susan Foreman episode at pagefillers.com

BBC Radio comedy programmes
BBC Radio 4 programmes
1994 radio programme debuts